The Obediah Barber Homestead is a late-19th century homestead of Obediah Barber (1825-1909).  The homestead was built in 1870 and is near the northern edge of the Okefenokee Swamp in Ware County, Georgia, 7 miles south of Waycross, Georgia.  Barber, who was known as the "King of the Swamp", was a great explorer of the swamp.  The main house, the detached kitchen, and the well were added to the National Register of Historic Places in 1995.

Today
Today the site is run as a museum to show typical life of the late 1800s in the area.  There are over 20 structures, but none of them are original except the main house and the kitchen.  The site features a large collection of pre-mechanical farming equipment and a moonshine still.  It contains a nature trail and few animals.

Photos

References

External links
 
 Official website
 Tourist info

Buildings and structures in Ware County, Georgia
Houses completed in 1870
Houses on the National Register of Historic Places in Georgia (U.S. state)
National Register of Historic Places in Ware County, Georgia